The Doran Memorial Bridge is the twin pair of steel girder bridges that carry eight lanes of road traffic on Interstate 280 over San Mateo Creek near Hillsborough, California in San Mateo County.

History
The Doran Memorial Bridge was originally known as the San Mateo Creek Bridge according to Caltrans plans. It was named the Eugene A. Doran Memorial Bridge in 1969, after the Hillsborough police officer who was killed near the site on August 5, 1959; Doran's widow attended the ribbon-cutting ceremony on May 28, 1969. In 2004, the bridge was rededicated as the Officer Eugene A. Doran and Marine Lance Corporal Patrick M. Doran Memorial Bridge to include his son, Patrick, who died in Vietnam on February 18, 1967 while serving in the United States Marine Corps.

Prior to the opening ceremony on May 28, 1969, a "Pedestrian Day" was held on May 25, with more than 30,000 crossing the new span on foot.

It won the Medium Span, High Clearance category in the 1970 AISC steel bridges contest. That stop also features a  statue of Junipero Serra. The Doran Memorial Bridge was featured on the cover of the 1972 Highway Statistics report published by the Federal Highway Administration with other recently completed major structures, including the Verrazano-Narrows Bridge, the Chesapeake Bay Bridge-Tunnel, and the Cowlitz River Bridge.

Design and construction

The bridge was designed by Caltrans architect Warren S. Ludlow, engineers Robert Cassano and Delmar Janson, with assistance from Mario J. Ciampi. Ciampi was commissioned to design freeway structures for I-280 by the Division of Highways in 1963.

Four arched concrete piers support the twin girder bridges. They use modified Gothic arches; the finish was left in the natural concrete color, and the surfaces were contoured to help them blend into their surroundings. The structural steel is concealed by a slanted panel on either side. Bids were opened on April 7, 1965, for the stretch of freeway including the San Mateo Creek Bridge. To minimize impact on the gorge below, materials were lowered from a "high line" built between towers on the adjoining cliffs. It is next to the 1888 Crystal Springs Dam, which was (at the time of its completion) the largest concrete structure in the world. Construction of the first pier began in January 1966.

See also
 The Flintstone House

References

External links

Doran family
 
 
 
 

Bridges in San Mateo County, California
Girder bridges
Road bridges in California
Steel bridges in the United States
Bridges completed in 1967
Bridges on the Interstate Highway System